Brakel is a municipality in the Belgian province of East Flanders in the Denderstreek and the Flemish Ardennes. The name is derived from a Carolingian villa Braglo first mentioned in 866 and located in the center of Opbrakel. Since 1970, the municipality has comprised the villages of Nederbrakel, Opbrakel, Michelbeke, Elst, Zegelsem. In 1977 Everbeek, Parike and part of Sint-Maria-Oudenhove were added. On 1 January 2018, Brakel had a population of 14,781. The area is 56.46 km² which gives a population density of 262 per km². The mayor is Stefaan De Vleeschouwer.

The region is known for the green hills and valleys, which attract cyclists and walkers and play a role in the Tour of Flanders cycling race.

The Braekel chicken is named after the town.

Orientation boards at the top enable visitors to identify places of interest in all directions.

Famous inhabitants
Alexander De Croo, politician, Prime Minister of Belgium since 2020
Herman De Croo, politician, former president of the Chamber of Representatives of Belgium
Robbie McEwen, cyclist, won 12 stages in the Tour de France
Peter van Petegem, cyclist, won Paris–Roubaix and the Tour of Flanders

References

External links

Official website  

 
Municipalities of East Flanders
Populated places in East Flanders